George Fitzgerald Harding (born 26 April 1999), known as Fitz Harding, is an English rugby union player who plays for Bristol Bears in Premiership Rugby.

Harding studied History at Durham University (Hatfield College). He initially 'slipped through the net' and was only assigned a place in the fourth team of the university rugby club, but soon climbed the ranks.

References

External links
Bristol Profile
ESPN Profile
Ultimate Rugby Profile

1999 births
Living people
Alumni of Hatfield College, Durham
Durham University RFC players
English rugby union players
People educated at Wellington College, Berkshire
Rugby union players from Kensington
Rugby union flankers